Gustav Nezval (18 November 1907 – 17 September 1998) by civil name Augustin Nezval, was a Czech stage and film actor.

Biography
Nezval was born to a locksmith family of Frantisek Nezval and his wife Aloisia. The parents wanted him to become a priest. However he managed to finish a technical college and for some time he earned his living as a building designer. He never attended any school of dramatic art. His enthusiastic passion for theatre brought him to make some acting attempts on the amateurish stage. Later he began to perform in various road show theatre companies. Still later he successively became a stage actor of Intimni Theatre in Prague (1930–1931), of South Bohemia's Theatre in České Budejovice (1931–1932), of Svanda's Theatre in Prague (1932–1934), of Vlasta Burian's Theatre in Prague (1934–1935), of National Theatre in Ostrava (1935–1938), of National Theatre in Brno (1938–1941), and finally of Vinohrady's Theatre in Prague (1941–1977). Even after his retirement in 1977 he still from time to time performed on Vinohrady's stage as a guest-actor till his last and final appearance before the public in 1997.

Thanks to his impressive masculine stature, handsome face with expressive eyes, along with charming manners heightened by a pleasant and resonant voice he, at first, impersonated various lover characters. As he aged, he began to adapt to more various roles, thus starting his career as a classical actor, appearing subsequently in plays of the Czech national literature and the world literature as well (Tyl, Jirasek, Vrchlicky, Langer, Sramek, Capek, Hasek, Sophocles, Lope de Vega, Molière, Flaubert, Strindberg, Rostand, Schiller, Goldoni, Gorkij, Balzac, Lermontov, Pushkin, Tolstoi, Shakespeare, at al).

In July 1937 he married a stage dancer Gertrude Nettel, with whom he lived till her death 57 years later and with whom he had two sons. He had two hobbies which he gave all his free time to. He loved literature and gardening.

He began to appear in films in the end of the 1930s. Nezval made his very film debut in a comedy film "Jarcin professor" distributed in 1937. His performance attracted attention of several leading Czech film directors. This resulted in his appearance in many similar films made in a quick succession. One of his most well known films had become "Jan Cimbura", – film based upon a novel of the very same name of the one of the nineteenth-century Czech literature classics, J.S. Baar. Shortly after the war he appeared in a title role in the film "Muzi bez kridel, alias Men without Wings, alias Les Hommes sans ailes", which was later honoured by the Golden Palm Award in Cannes Film Festival in 1946. In many films he was a partner of several most famous Czech movie star-actresses of that era. One of them was Mrs.Lída Baarová. His last film role, shot in his ninetieth year, was a supporting role in a war drama "Je třeba zabít Sekala, alias Sekal has to die". Altogether he appeared in 52 films between 1937 and 1998.

He appeared in radio and TV as well. Some of these appearances belonged, however, to the beginning of TV broadcasting (in the early 1950s) in Czechoslovakia, and therefore many of them have not been recorded.

Gustav Nezval died on 17 September 1998, two months before his 91st birthday. Seven years after his death, Pavlína Vajčnerova published in 2005 his biography titled Gustav Nezval – oči spíše sympatické.

Selected filmography

 Jarčin professor  (dr. Karel Stržický) 1937
 Armádní dvojčata  (npor. Zdeněk) 1937
 Děti na zakázku (MUDr. Karel Matys) 1938
 Ideál septimy (ing. Ivan Kareš alias skladatel Michal Martan) 1938
 Dvojí život  (povaleč Slaba) 1939
 Osmnáctiletá (Antonín Perný) 1939
 Ženy u benzínu (sedlák Karel Loukota) 1939
 Babička (1940) (Černý myslivec) 1940
 Maskovaná milenka (Leon z Costy) 1940
 Muzikantská Liduška (Toník Jareš) 1940
 Pelikán má alibi (vrchní komisař Moudrý) 1940
 Jan Cimbura (Jan Cimbura) 1941
 Nocturnal Butterfly (npor. Varga) 1941
 Muži nestárnou (lesník Jan Parner) 1941
 Tanečnice (princ Maxmilián ze Sylvánie) 1941
 Děvčica z Beskyd (Tomáš Hanulík) 1944
 Počestné paní pardubické (rychtářský písař Prokop Trubka) 1944
 Černí myslivci (1945)
 Men Without Wings (1946)
 Nikola Šuhaj (Nikola Šuhaj) 1947
  Ulica Graniczna (role unknown) 1948
 Vzbouření na vsi (Valenta) 1949
 DS 70 nevyjíždí (dr. Vítek) 1950
 Veselý souboj (mjr. Zahrádka) 1950
 Plavecký mariáš (Šebek) 1952
 Expres z Norimberka (plk. Prokop) 1953
 Ještě svatba nebyla (Francek Gajdoš) 1953
 Nevěra (Lang) 1956
 Legenda o lásce (hvězdopravec) 1957
 Hlavní výhra (číšník) 1958
 Zatoulané dělo (plk. Hanzlík) 1958
 Mstitel (zedník Kryštof) 1959
 Zkouška pokračuje (herec) 1959
 Malý Bobeš (Libra) 1961
 Prosím, nebudit (Petr Parléř) 1962
 Vánice (film) Vánice (chatař na Výrovce) 1962
 Hvězda (film) Hvězda (Roman) 1969
 Velká neznámá (professor) 1970
 Šance (překladatel) 1971
 Dny zrady (dr. Kamil Krofta) 1973
 Sokolovo (mjr. Vrbenský) 1974
 Akce v Istanbulu (Kment) 1975
 Šílený kankán  1982
 Šašek a královna  1987
 Je třeba zabít Sekala (sedlák Štverák) 1998

Literature
 Svatopluk Beneš: Být hercem, Melantrich, Praha, 1992, str. 68
 Jaroslav Brož, Myrtil Frída: Historie československého filmu v obrazech 1930 – 1945, Orbis, Praha, 1966, str. 178–180, 196, 225, 231, foto 465, 466, 471, 473, 474, 518, 615, 636
 Jindřich Černý: Osudy českého divadla po druhé světové válce – Divadlo a společnost 1945 – 1955, Academia, Praha, 2007, str. 168, 292, 
 Kolektiv autorů: Dějiny českého divadla/IV., Academia, Praha, 1983, str. 402, 478, 486, 499, 660–1
  Adina Mandlová: Dneska už se tomu směju, vyd. Čs. filmový ústav, 1990, str. 119–121
 Stanislav Motl: Mraky nad Barrandovem, Rybka Publishers, Praha, 2006, str. 68, 130, 166, 235–6, 
 Stanislav Motl: Prokletí Lídy Baarové, Rybka Publishers, Praha, 2002, str. 120, 137, 176, 214, 
 V. Müller a kol.: Padesát let Městských divadel pražských 1907 – 1957, vyd. Ústřední národní výbor hl. m. Prahy, Praha, 1958, str. 179
  František Kovářík: Kudy všudy za divadlem, Odeon, Praha, 1982, str. 259, 349, 350
  Z. Sílová, R. Hrdinová, A. Kožíková, V. Mohylová : Divadlo na Vinohradech 1907 – 2007 – Vinohradský ansámbl, vydalo Divadlo na Vinohradech, Praha, 2007, str. 61, 65, 83, 183, 193, 
 Ladislav Tunys: Hodně si pamatuju...Perličky v duši Raoula Schránila, Ametyst, Praha, 1998, str. 120, 132, 181, 
 Ladislav Tunys: Otomar Korbelář, nakl. XYZ, Praha, 2011, str. 104, 
 Pavlína Vajčnerová: Gustav Nezval: Oči spíše sympatické, Brána, Praha, 2005, 
 Marie Valtrová: Kronika rodu Hrušínských, Odeon, Praha, 1994, str. 155, 177, 
 Jiří Žák a kol.: Divadlo na Vinohradech 1907 – 2007 – Vinohradský příběh'', vydalo Divadlo na Vinohradech, Praha, 2007, str. 192,

External links
 
 Gustav Nezval in the Czech film heaven (in Czech)
 Gustav Nezval  in the Czech-Slovak film database (in Czech)
  in a trailer from 1940 Czech Film "Maskovaná Milenka alias The Masked Lover" based upon Balzacs Story

1907 births
1998 deaths
Czech male television actors
Czech male film actors
Czech male stage actors
20th-century Czech male actors